A by-election was held on 14 March 2008 for the vacant seat of the Assembly of Experts in Tehran Province, caused by death of Ali Meshkini who held office as chairman of the assembly. It was held along with the 2008 Iranian legislative election.

The seat was won by conservative Mohammad-Reza Mahdavi Kani, the secretary-General of Combatant Clergy Association, who was endorsed by Society of Seminary Teachers of Qom in addition to his own organization. The parliamentary electoral alliance United Front of Principlists also supported him.

The candidate supported by the reformists ended up in the third place.

Result

References 

Elections in Tehran
2000s in Tehran
By-elections in Iran
2008 elections in Iran